Martha Soukup (born 20 July 1959 in Aurora, Illinois) is a  science fiction author and playwright for the Monday Night PlayGround emerging playwrights group.  In 2003, she won their annual June Anne Baker Prize commission.

The 1994 short film Override, directed by Danny Glover, was based on her short story "Over the Long Haul".

Biography 

She attended the Clarion science fiction writing workshop in 1985, with such other emerging SF talents as Robert J. Howe, Geoffrey A. Landis, Kristine Kathryn Rusch, William Shunn, and Mary Turzillo.

She lives in San Francisco, California.

Collections

 Rosemary's Brain: And Other Tales of Wonder (1992)
Wildside Press - 
With introduction by John Gregory Betancourt.
 Arbitrary Placement of Walls (1997)
Dreamhaven Books -  (Hardback) -  (Paperback)
Contains the Nebula-award winning story "A Defense of the Social Contracts".  With introduction by Neil Gaiman.

Short-stories
 Plowshare - (1992) (collected in Mike Resnick's alternate history anthology Alternate Presidents)
 Rosemary’s Brain - (1992) (collected in Mike Resnick's alternate history anthology Alternate Kennedys)
 Good Girl, Bad Dog - (1994) (collected in Mike Resnick's alternate history anthology Alternate Outlaws)

Awards and nominations

 1991: Nominee, Hugo Award for Best Novelette for "Over the Long Haul"
 1991: Nominee, Nebula Award for Best Novelette for "Over the Long Haul"
 1992: Nominee, Hugo Award for Best Short Story for "Dog's Life"
 1992: Nominee, Nebula Award for Best Short Story for "Dog's Life"
 1993: Nominee, World Fantasy Award for Best Short Fiction for "The Arbitrary Placement of Walls"
 1993: Nominee, Hugo Award for Best Short Story for "The Arbitrary Placement of Walls"
 1993: Nominee, Nebula Award for Best Short Story for "The Arbitrary Placement of Walls"
 1994: Nominee, Nebula Award for Best Novelette for "Things Not Seen"
 1994: Nominee, Hugo Award for Best Short Story for "The Story So Far"
 1995: Winner, Nebula Award for Best Short Story for "A Defense of the Social Contracts"

References
 Bibliography at Fantastic Fiction
 Martha Soukup at The Encyclopedia of Science Fiction

External links
 
 "Five Stories by Martha Soukup" - article from the New York Review of Science Fiction by Ray Davis.
 The Arbitrary Placement of Walls - review by Susan Dunman in Science Fiction Weekly.
 Martha Soukup interview at The WELL

20th-century American short story writers
American science fiction writers
American women short story writers
American short story writers
American women poets
Nebula Award winners
Living people
1959 births
Women science fiction and fantasy writers
20th-century American women writers
21st-century American women